Athyrium angustum, the northern lady fern, is a fern native to northeastern North America.  It was long included in the superspecies Athyrium filix-femina, but is now largely recognized as a distinct species.

Athyrium angustum has a more southern counterpart — Athyrium asplenioides, the southern lady fern — that is very similar. The latter has a broader frond, especially at the base.

References

aa

External links
 

angustum
Ferns of the United States
Flora of the Great Lakes region (North America)
Flora of the Northeastern United States
Flora of Canada
Flora of Ohio
Plants described in 1810
Flora without expected TNC conservation status